Kataruchak (or Kataru Chack) is a village in Pathankot district of Punjab, India. The village comes under Post office Faridanagar and Tehsil as well as district Pathankot. The village is surrounded by 2 water bodies from 2 ends and has highly fertile land. The village Kataru Chack is having 4 sub-division within itself. These divisions are: 
 Kataru Chack (Main)
 Purana Pind (Old Village)
 Upprala Chack (Upper Side of Village having Shiv Mandir and Cultivation Fields)
 Mahi Chack (Mostly having cultivation fields)
Important points about Kataru Chack:
 The village is having a population of around 1500.
 It has a very well known and ancient Shiv temple named Chat Pat Bani.
 It has highly fertile fields land and irrigation sources.

Pathankot district